Frederick William Tomley (11 July 1931 – 13 February 1981) was an English footballer who played as a defender in the Football League for Liverpool and Chester. He also played non-league football for Litherland and Witton Albion.

References

1931 births
1981 deaths
Footballers from Liverpool
English footballers
Association football defenders
Liverpool F.C. players
Chester City F.C. players
Witton Albion F.C. players
English Football League players